Tucker’s Monster is the first novel written by Hollywood screenwriter, producer and director S. S. Wilson.

The book was independently published in 2010 by Real Deal Productions Inc. and was the winner of the 2011 USA Best Book Awards in the category of Best New Fiction. S. S. Wilson is best known for writing the film Short Circuit and as a writer, producer and director in the Tremors film and television series.

Plot
Set in 1903, Tucker’s Monster chronicles the adventures of Oklahoma Rancher Harold B. Tucker as he follows his passion of researching mythical and legendary creatures.

References

2010 American novels
Fiction set in 1903
English-language novels
Novels set in the 1900s
Novels set in Oklahoma
American fantasy novels
2010 debut novels